Spialia galba, the Indian grizzled skipper, is a hesperiid butterfly which is found in South Asia and parts of Southeast Asia.

Distribution and status
The butterfly ranges from Sri Lanka, India to the Shan states in northern Myanmar, Thailand, Vietnam and Hainan.

The butterfly is very common in India up to an altitude of 1800 m.

Subspecies
Spialia galba galba (Pakistan, India, Kashmir, Nepal, Sikkim, Bhutan, Ceylon, Thailand)
Spialia galba shanta Evans, 1956 (Burma)
Spialia galba chenga Evans, 1956 (China: Hainan)

Description

Having a wingspan of only 24 to 27 mm, Spialia galba is identified by its unique pattern of black and white spots and its small size.  The upperside is dark brown to black in colour with a light brown gloss and many small white spots. The wings have a chequered fringe. The underside is whitish. Sexes are identical.

Habits
When sunny, the butterfly is found flying close to the ground and basking with the wings partly open. The forewing is partly closed while the hindwing is held fully open. It rests with wings closed. It has a swift, twisting but usually short flight. The Indian skipper visits flowers, preferring those with small flowers such as Tridax procumbens, (a common weed in India) and species of Dicplitera or Bidens. It sleeps on hanging grass blades and the tips of the branches of herbs.

Life history

Egg
The egg is shiny, light green, dome shaped, ridged and fused together. The female lays her eggs anywhere and on any position of the young shoots of its food plant.

Caterpillar
The caterpillar is pale green with a wavy dark green line dorsally. It is cylindrical, but thicker in the centre and tapering towards the ends. The body is clothed with fine whitish bristles and a line of long white hair on both sides. The head of the butterfly is obscured by dark hair and the jaws are orange red and black tipped. The second segment of the early instars is dark brown and has a golden central bar on the nape. As the caterpillar matures, it develops prominent black-bordered orange markings on the neck. The caterpillar resides in a folded leaf secured from all sides except the entrance. It feeds in the late evenings and nocturnally.

Pupa
It has a thick, cylindrical, greyish-green pupa which tapers towards the abdomen. It is covered with fine dirty-white bristles near the head and eyes.

Food plants
Fabaceae:
Soybean
 Malvaceae:
Alcea rosea
 Hibiscus spp.
Melochia corchorifolia
 Sida rhombifolia
Urena lobata
Waltheria indica

Cited references

See also
Hesperiidae
List of butterflies of India (Pyrginae)
List of butterflies of India (Hesperiidae)

References

Print

Online

Spialia
Butterflies of Asia
Butterflies described in 1793